Edward Joseph DeSaulnier Jr. (January 8, 1921 – April 20, 1989) was an American politician and judge from the commonwealth of Massachusetts. He served in the Massachusetts House of Representatives from 1949 through 1957, in the Massachusetts Senate from 1957 through 1958, and on the Massachusetts Superior Court from 1958 through 1972. His son, Mark DeSaulnier, is a member of the United States House of Representatives.

Early life
DeSaulnier is from Chelmsford, Massachusetts. He graduated from Holy Cross College. During World War II, DeSaulnier served as a combat pilot in the United States Marine Corps. He served during the Battle of Iwo Jima. After the war, he graduated from the Boston University School of Law.

Career
DeSaulnier served in the Massachusetts House of Representatives from 1949 through 1957, when he took a seat in the Massachusetts Senate. Governor Foster Furcolo appointed DeSaulnier to the Massachusetts Superior Court in 1958. In 1962, DeSaulnier was accused of accepting bribes from a criminal defendant. Though the statute of limitations meant he could not be charged, DeSaulnier was disbarred by the Massachusetts Supreme Judicial Court in 1972.

After his disbarment, DeSaulnier worked for a company that sold bulletproof vests. He developed alcoholism, recovered, and then earned a degree from Rutgers University's School of Alcohol Studies and became deputy director of Broward County, Florida's commission on alcoholism. He petitioned the Massachusetts Board of Bar Overseers to reinstate his law license in 1979, but his request was denied in 1980. The New England Patriots hired DeSaulnier in 1981 to consult on issues around substance abuse.

Personal life
DeSaulnier died in his home in Juno Beach, Florida, in 1989, by a self-inflicted gunshot. He had four sons and one daughter, including Mark, a politician who serves in the U.S. House of Representatives.

See also
 Massachusetts legislature: 1949–1950, 1951–1952, 1953–1954, 1955–1956
 Massachusetts Senate's 1st Middlesex district

References

1989 deaths
People from Chelmsford, Massachusetts
Members of the Massachusetts House of Representatives
Massachusetts state senators
Massachusetts Superior Court justices
College of the Holy Cross alumni
Boston University School of Law alumni
United States Marine Corps pilots of World War II
1921 births
Suicides by firearm in Florida
20th-century American politicians
20th-century American judges
Military personnel from Massachusetts